Andrei Anatolievich Kiryukhin (4 August 1987 – 7 September 2011) was a Russian professional ice hockey winger who played for Lokomotiv Yaroslavl of the Kontinental Hockey League (KHL).

Besides Lokomotiv, he also played for Lokomotiv-2 (its farm team), Belgorod and Kapitan teams. Playing for Russia at the 2007 World Junior Ice Hockey Championships he won a silver medal. His father Anatoly Kiryukhin was a football player and coach.

Death
On 7 September 2011, Kiryukhin  was killed in the 2011 Lokomotiv Yaroslavl plane crash, when a Yakovlev Yak-42 passenger aircraft, carrying nearly his entire Lokomotiv team, crashed just outside Yaroslavl, Russia. The team was traveling to Minsk to play their opening game of the season, with its coaching staff and prospects. Lokomotiv officials said "'everyone from the main roster was on the plane plus four players from the youth team.'"

See also
List of ice hockey players who died during their playing career

References

External links

1987 births
2011 deaths
Lokomotiv Yaroslavl players
Sportspeople from Yaroslavl
Russian ice hockey right wingers
Victims of the Lokomotiv Yaroslavl plane crash